The Cathedral of the Most Sacred Heart of Jesus is a cathedral and parish church located in Knoxville, Tennessee, United States. It is the seat of the Catholic Diocese of Knoxville. The original cathedral church was completed in 1956 and the present church was completed in 2018.

History

Sacred Heart Parish
Sacred Heart Parish can trace its history back to 1952 when Bishop William Adrian of Nashville; the Rev. Joseph P. Follman, V.F., Dean of East Tennessee; and the Rev. Christopher P. Murray, Pastor of the Church of the Immaculate Conception in Knoxville determined that Knoxville needed a third Catholic parish.  Land was purchased in Bearden the following year for $25,000.  The Rev. Edward Dolan replaced Father Murray as Immaculate Conception’s pastor in 1955.  He started to negotiate with Baumann and Baumann Architects and Emory and Richards General Contractors to build a church, school, rectory, and convent for $1 million. The parish was officially established on January 1, 1956, with 199 families.  Father Dolan was appointed the parish’s first pastor and served the parish until 1972.  He initially made his residence in one of the finished rooms of the school building on July 18, 1956. Sacred Heart School opened on September 4, 1956, with an enrollment of 132 students and 5 faculty members.  The rectory was completed in November of the same year.  The first Mass celebrated in the new church was Midnight Mass on Christmas, 1956.

The Rev. Joseph Julius served Sacred Heart as pastor from 1972 to 1981. The parish had grown to over 1,000 families by this time.  A gymnasium, new classrooms in the school and a school library were built during this time. St. John Neumann Parish was established in Farragut and took some parishioners from Sacred Heart. Further expansion of the physical plant was accomplished during the Rev. Robert Hofstetter’s pastorate from 1981 until 1987. Additions included kindergarten, science labs, computer labs, an art department, and other modifications.

Sacred Heart Cathedral
The Rev. Xavier Mankel was named pastor in 1987. The following year on May 27 Pope John Paul II established the Diocese of Knoxville and Sacred Heart became the new diocese’s cathedral.

All Saints Parish, which included parts of Sacred Heart, was established in September 1994. The Rev. Al Humbrecht was named pastor in 1997. In 1999 he was named the Diocesan Administrator after Bishop Anthony O'Connell was transferred to the Diocese of Palm Beach. The Rev. David Boettner was named the pastor and cathedral rector in 2010. At the time there were 1,411 families in the parish The parish community has grown to 1,600 families as of June 2016. Sacred Heart Cathedral School enrollment averages 700 Preschool through 8th-grade students yearly.

Cathedral of the Most Sacred Heart of Jesus
The new Cathedral of the Most Sacred Heart of Jesus was built in front of the older church. The architect of record is the Knoxville architectural firm of BarberMcMurry and the design architecture firm is McCrery Architects Official website with the ecclesiastical architect James McCrery located in Washington, D.C. Groundbreaking was held on April 19, 2015. It was built by Merit Construction of Knoxville. Dedication for the $30.8 million structure was held on March 3, 2018. The dome's interior features images of the Sacred Heart of Jesus and his Twelve Apostles. Other saints are depicted below. The exterior of the cruciform structure is clad in Indiana limestone and Roman-style bricks from Ohio. Seventeen types of marble were used in the interior. The former cathedral was converted into the parish fellowship hall.

See also
List of Catholic cathedrals in the United States
List of cathedrals in the United States

References

External links

Cathedral website
Diocese of Knoxville website

Christian organizations established in 1956
Roman Catholic churches completed in 2018
Roman Catholic cathedrals in Tennessee
Roman Catholic churches in Tennessee
Roman Catholic Diocese of Knoxville
Renaissance Revival architecture in Tennessee
Churches in Knoxville, Tennessee
1956 establishments in Tennessee
New Classical architecture